The Little Blue Light (Goluboy ogonyok) was a popular musical variety show aired on Soviet television since 1962 during  various holidays. The name alludes to the light bluish glare of a black-and-white cathode ray tube TV screen as well as some traditional Russian expressions relating to friendly visits: заглянуть на огонек (zaglyanut na ogonyok) – "to drop in on a light", i. e. to visit someone after seeing a light in their window; посидеть у огонька (posidyet' u ogon'ka) – to have a sit by the fire.

The show featured popular artists and various prominent Soviet people: udarniks, Heroes of Socialist Labor, cosmonauts etc., who sat by the tables in a "TV cafeteria", singing songs, playing sketches, boasting, celebrating the holiday. The idea of the show was that they "dropped in on a light" to every Soviet family to share the festive table beyond the TV glass.

The best-known was the New Year's Little Blue Light (Novogodniy Goluboy ogonyok), aired on every New Year's Eve as a part of the late Soviet tradition: the Little Blue Light followed the New Year's speech by the General Secretary of the Communist Party with congratulations to the Soviet people followed by the Kremlin midnight chimes and the State Anthem of the Soviet Union, which was, in turn, preceded by the 1975 film comedy Irony of Fate.

The Little Blue Light was devised by film director Aleksey Gabrilovich, and the first show was aired on 6 April 1962 as a weekly Saturday broadcast. After some time it became a monthly show, and later it was only aired on major holidays.

After the dissolution of the Soviet Union, the Little Blue Light was revived in Russia as a yearly special. The trademark "Little Blue Light" is now owned by Russia 1, the television network, where it is still seen today. 

In the 1970s the typical New Year's LBL episode lasted an hour and a half, since the late 1980s up till today the telecast begins at 12:05 am MST and lasts for three hours.

References

External links
 Итоги года и традиции телевизионной новогодней ночи ( Annual Reckoning and Traditions of the New Year's Eve on Television), Radio Freedom, 29 December 2002 

Russia-1 original programming
Entertainment in the Soviet Union
New Year's television specials
Russian music television series
Variety television series
1970s Soviet television series 
1980s Soviet television series
1990s Russian television series
2000s Russian television series
2010s Russian television series